Felicia Brabec (born  1974) is an American politician serving as a member of the Michigan House of Representatives from the 55th district. Elected in 2020, she assumed office on January 1, 2021.

Early life and education
Brabec was born around 1974 in Aurora, Illinois. In 1995, Brabec earned a bachelor's degree from Saint Mary's College. In 1997, Brabec earned a master's degree from Boston College. In 2003, Brabec earned a Ph.D. from the Illinois School of Professional Psychology. Later that year, Brabec moved to Ann Arbor, Michigan, for a post-doctoral fellowship at the University of Michigan.

Career
Brabec is a clinical psychologist who owns her own private practice. She has worked in this capacity with the University of Michigan Counseling and Psychological Services. She has also served as a high school social worker. In 2020, in response to the COVID-19 pandemic, Brabec co-founded the website, MI Frontline Support, a statewide website which compiled mental health resources for frontline workers, who had to work during the pandemic. Brabec serves on the board of directors for the nonprofit food bank, Food Gatherers. She also is involved with the mental health organizations Garrett's Space and the Washtenaw Psychology Society.

Brabec was appointed to the Washtenaw County Board of Commissioners' 4th district seat in 2011. Brabec served as chair of the board from 2015 to 2016. In 2020, Brabec did not seek re-election, and instead ran for the Michigan House of Representatives representing the 55th district. On November 3, 2020, Brabec was elected to the Michigan House of Representatives, and has represented the 55th district since January 1, 2021.

Personal life
Brabec lives in Pittsfield Charter Township, Michigan. Brabec is married to David. Together they have two children.

References

External links
Official website
MI Frontline Support

Living people
1974 births
21st-century American psychologists
American women psychologists
Boston College alumni
County commissioners in Michigan
Democratic Party members of the Michigan House of Representatives
People from Aurora, Illinois
Politicians from Ann Arbor, Michigan
Saint Mary's College (Indiana) alumni
University of Michigan faculty
Women state legislators in Michigan
21st-century American women politicians
21st-century American politicians
American women academics